Marion A. Brooks was an actor, playwright, and theater businessman. He partnered on the Bijou theater company at the newly established Bijou Theater in Montgomery, Alabama with players from Chicago. After it folded, he returned to work at the Pekin Theatre in Chicago.

With Flournoy Miller, he founded the Bijou Stock Company in Montgomery, Alabama in 1908. It closed in May 1908. He helped open the Chester Amusement Company with J. Ed. Green, a theater operator in Chicago.

Theater
Ephraham Johnson from Norfolk (1908), co-starred as Harry Blue and co-wrote

Works
Out All Night co-wrote with J. E. Green
Panama (1908) co-wrote with Charles A. Hunter

References

African-American actors
American male stage actors
African-American dramatists and playwrights
American male dramatists and playwrights
African-American businesspeople
Year of birth missing
Place of birth missing
African-American male writers